Balbina Remedios Langanehin was a Cuban lawyer and politician. She was elected to the House of Representatives in 1936 as one of the first group of women to enter Congress.

Biography
A lawyer, Remedios was a Democratic National Association candidate for the House of Representatives in La Habana Province in the 1936 general elections, the first in which women could vote. She was one of seven women elected, serving in the House until 1938.

References

Cuban women lawyers
20th-century Cuban women politicians
20th-century Cuban politicians
Democratic National Association politicians
Members of the Cuban House of Representatives
Date of birth unknown
Date of death unknown
20th-century Cuban lawyers